The Electoral (Amendment) Act 1947 (No. 31) was a law in Ireland which revised Dáil constituencies. The new constituencies were first used for the 13th Dáil, elected at the 1948 general election on 4 February 1948.

This Act repealed the Electoral (Revision of Constituencies) Act 1935, which defined the constituencies since the 1937 general election. It also increased the number of seats in the Dáil by 9 from 138 to 147. It was used at the 1951, 1954 and 1957 general elections.

The 1947 revision was repealed by the Electoral (Amendment) Act 1961, which created a new schedule of constituencies first used at the 1961 general election for the 17th Dáil.

Background
In 1947 the rapid rise of new party Clann na Poblachta threatened the position of the governing party Fianna Fáil. The government of Éamon de Valera introduced the Act, which increased the size of the Dáil from 138 to 147 and increased the number of three-seat constituencies from fifteen to twenty-two. The result was described by the journalist and historian Tim Pat Coogan as "a blatant attempt at gerrymander which no Six County Unionist could have bettered". The following February, at the 1948 general election, Clann na Poblachta secured ten seats instead of the nineteen they would have received proportional to their national vote. No Dáil constituency has had more than five seats since 1948. The Constitutional Convention's 2013 recommendation to increase proportionality by having larger constituencies was rejected by the Fine Gael–Labour government on the grounds that "the three, four or five seat Dáil constituency arrangement has served the State well since 1948".

Constituencies 1948–1961
Key to columns
 Constituency: The name of the constituency. Compass points follow the area name in this list, which was not always the case in the official version of the name.
 Created: The year of the election when a constituency of the same name was first defined.
 Seats: The number of TDs elected from the constituency under the Act.
 Change: Change in the number of seats since the last distribution of seats (which took effect in 1937).

Summary of changes
This list summarises the changes in representation. It does not address revisions to the boundaries of constituencies.

See also
Elections in the Republic of Ireland

References

Electoral 1947
1947 in Irish law
Acts of the Oireachtas of the 1940s